

First stage

Summary

Game 1

Game 2

Game 3

Second stage

Summary

Game 1

Game 2

Game 3

Game 4

Game 5

References

Pacific League Playoffs
Pacific League Playoffs